Frederick Nicholas Coumbe (December 13, 1889 – March 21, 1978) was a pitcher who played in Major League Baseball from 1914 through 1921. Coumbe batted and threw left-handed. He was born in Antrim, Pennsylvania.

Biography
He was born on December 13, 1889, in Antrim, Pennsylvania.

His most productive season came in 1918 with the Indians, when he posted career-highs in wins (13), starts (17), strikeouts (41) and innings pitched (150). Coumbe saved himself from baseball anonymity as one of the few players to appear in the major leagues' last triple-header, played on October 2, 1920 between the Cincinnati Reds and Pittsburgh Pirates at Forbes Field. Cincinnati won the first two games, 13–4 and 7–3, and Pittsburgh won the third, 6–0. He saw action in right field in Game 1 and started at center field in Game 3. After his major league career ended with the Reds, he spent the next decade in the minor leagues, including three seasons with the Salt Lake City Bees.

In an eight-season career, Coumbe posted a 38–38 record with 212 strikeouts and a 2.80 ERA in  innings, including four shutouts and 30 complete games. A good hitting pitcher, he also was used as a pinch-hitter, collecting a .206 batting average (52-for-252) with one home run and 30 RBI.

Coumbe died on March 21, 1978, in Paradise, California at the age of 88.

References

External links

Baseball Library
Retrosheet
Baseball Records Registry, by Joseph J. Dittmar, McFarland, 1997

Boston Red Sox players
Cincinnati Reds players
Cleveland Indians players
Cleveland Naps players
Major League Baseball pitchers
Major League Baseball outfielders
Baseball players from Pennsylvania
1889 births
1978 deaths
St. Paul Saints (AA) players
San Francisco Seals (baseball) players
Salt Lake City Bees players
Hollywood Stars players
Chattanooga Lookouts players
Mobile Bears players
Baltimore Orioles (IL) players
Elmira Colonels players
York White Roses players